Sir Ben Kingsley, CBE (born Krishna Bhanji; Gujarati:કૃષ્ણા પંડિત ભાણજી; 31 December 1943) is an English actor who has received numerous accolades throughout his career which spans over five decades, including a Grammy Award, two Golden Globe Awards, a Screen Actors Guild Award, a BAFTA Award, and an Academy Award from four nominations. He is known for starring as Mohandas Gandhi in the film Gandhi in 1982, for which he won the Academy Award for Best Actor. He is also known for his performances in the films Schindler's List (1993), Sexy Beast (2000), House of Sand and Fog (2003), Shutter Island (2010), Hugo (2011), Iron Man 3 (2013), and The Jungle Book (2016).

Filmography

Film

Television

Video games

References

External links

 

Male actor filmographies
British filmographies